Ağbulaq, Azerbaijan may refer to:
Ağbulaq, Ismailli
Ağbulaq, Jalilabad
Ağbulaq, Khojali
Ağbulaq, Khojavend
Ağbulaq, Lachin
Ağbulaq, Nakhchivan
Ağbulaq, Tovuz